"Guo", written in Chinese: 郭, is one of the most common Chinese surnames and means "the wall that surrounds a city" in Chinese. It can also be transliterated into English as Cok, Gou, Quo, Quach, Quek, Que, Keh, Kuo, Kwo, Kuoch, Kok, Koc, Kwee, Kwek, Kwik, Kwok, Kuok, Kuek, Gock, Koay, or Ker. The Korean equivalent is spelled Kwak; the Vietnamese equivalent is  Quach.
The different ways of spelling this surname indicate the origin of the family. For example, the Cantonese "Kwok" originated in Hong Kong and the surrounding area. 
It is the 18th most common family name in China and can be traced as far back as the Xia Dynasty. There are eight legendary origins of the Guo surname, which include a Persian (Hui) origin, a Korean origin, and a Mongolian origin, as a result of sinicization. However, the majority of people bearing the surname Guo are descended from the Han Chinese.

In 2019, Guo was the 16th common surname in Mainland China.

Origins

Royal Ancestors

Legend has it that the Guo family is descended from Yellow Emperor (黃帝), who is traditionally said to have ruled China around 2697–2597 or 2698–2598 BC. Yellow Emperor had 25 sons, 14 of which were offered by Yellow Emperor with 12 names. The first son of Yellow Emperor was Shaohao, bearing the surname Jī (姬) .
Shaohao begot Qiaoji (蟜極). 
Qiaoji begot Emperor Ku. 
Emperor Ku begot Hou Ji.
Hou Ji was the founder of Zhou kingdom in northwestern China. Hou Ji begot Buzhu. 
Buzhu begot Ji Ju. 
Ji Ju begot Gong Liu. 
Gong Liu begot Qingjie.
After nine generations following Qingjie, their descendant King Ji of Zhou became the king of Zhou.

Primogenitor
The surname of Guō descended from Prince Guo Shu (虢叔), the 3rd son of King Ji of Zhou. The character guó (虢, /*kʷraːɡ/) is rare in Chinese, and means "to hunt and flay a tiger", indicating that Guo Shu was a brave warrior. During the war unifying China, King Wen of Zhou always consulted his two younger brothers Guo Zhong (half brother) and Guo Shu (full brother). 

After establishing Zhou dynasty, King Wu of Zhou feoffed his uncle and mentor Guo Shu to the Western Guo (西虢) around 1054 b.c. Guo Shu was named the Duke of Guo (虢公) or with same pronunciation the Duke of Guo (郭公) since after.

Guo Shu is regarded by Guo's clan as their primogenitor.

In 658 B.C., Western Guo was extinguished and annexed by State of Jin. The descendants of the Guo's clan were exiled and populated to Jinyang (nowadays Taiyuan) and formally adopted the name Guo.

Guo Ting
Guo Ting (郭亭), died 178 B.C., a local usher (連敖), took part in the Great Insurrection against the Qin dynasty and joined the army of Emperor Liu Bang. He was feoffed at Renqiu and conferred Marquess of A Ling (阿陵侯) in July 201 B.C. after the establishment of Han Dynasty. Guo's clan lost their noble title since 7th century B.C. After almost five centuries, Guo Ting was the first one to acquire a noble title again. Since then, talented Guos began to be active in Chinese history continuously towards the climax of the glory of Guo Ziyi some 800 years later.

Guo Ting begot Guo Ke. Guo Ke begot Guo Ou. Guo Ou begot Guo Guangyi. Guo Guangyi begot Guo Yan (courtesy name: Mengru). Mengru moved his family from Taiyuan to the Huazhou District.

Guo Ziyi

About 700 years after Mengru moved to Huazhou District, Guo Ziyi stepped up to the stage of history.
Guo Ziyi (Sep.5, 698 AD - Jul.9, 781 AD). Prince Zhōngwǔ of Fényáng (汾陽忠武王), was the Tang dynasty general who wiped out the An Lushan Rebellion and participated in expeditions against the Uyghur Khaganate and Tibetan Empire. He was regarded as one of the most powerful Tang generals before and after the Anshi Rebellion. After his death, he was deified in Chinese folk religion as the God of Wealth and Happiness (Lu Star of Fu Lu Shou). 
Guo Ziyi was one of the most successful and satisfactory officials in China history. His achievements went far beyond Guo Shu and Guo Ting. He had eight brothers and eight sons and eight son-in-laws. Four of his sons conferred dukes and five of his sons and grandsons became Fuma(damat). All his son-in-laws were top brass of the country. one of his granddaughter became the Empress Dowager Guo (Tang dynasty). His descendants spread all over Northern China. Most of genealogy book of Guo's family over China record him as their first ancestor.

Hui surname
One of the Guo family is from Hui clans around Quanzhou in Fujian. 

Early in the 14th century, a Persian Al-Qudsan Al-Dhaghan Nam (伊本·庫斯·德廣貢·納姆) was sent to Quanzhou by Külüg Khan for assisting grain transportation by sea. He failed to return to Khanbaliq due to war, then got married and settled at Quanzhou. Because his Persian surname Dhaghan pronounces similar to Chinese Guo, Al-Qudsan Al-Dhaghan Nam's grandsons began to change their surname to Guo in order to assimilate with local Han Chinese. It was politically expedient to claim they were descendants of Guo Ziyi in order to be better accommodated by Local people and later Ming Dynasty government. After Haijin policy applied and the Portuguese began to dominate the China-Middle East maritime trade, they were more localized and recognized as descendants as Guo Ziyi by themselves and by local people.

Due to more people of these clans identifying as Hui the population of Hui as grown. All these clans needed was evidence of ancestry from Arab, Persian, or other Muslim ancestors to be recognized as Hui, and they did not need to practice Islam. The Communist party and its policies encouraged the definition of Hui as a nationality or ethnicity. The Chinese government's Historic Artifacts Bureau preserved tombs of Arabs and Persians whom Hui are descended from around Quanzhou. Many of these Hui worship their village guardian deities and are non-muslims; they include Buddhists, Taoists, followers of Chinese Folk Religions, secularists, and Christians. Many clans with thousands of members in numerous villages across Fujian recorded their genealogies and had Muslim ancestry. Hui clans originating in Fujian have a strong sense of unity among their members, despite being scattered across a wide area in Asia, such as Fujian, Taiwan, Singapore, Indonesia, and Philippines.

In Taiwan there are also descendants of Hui who came with Koxinga who no longer observe Islam, the Taiwan branch of the Guo (romanized as Kuo in Taiwan) family are non-muslims, but maintain a tradition of not offering pork at ancestral shrines. The Chinese Muslim Association counts these people as Muslims. The Taiwanese Guo clan view their Hui identity as irrelevant and don't assert that they are Hui.

Various different accounts are given as to whom the Hui Guo clan is descended from. Several of the Guo claimed descent from Han chinese General Guo Ziyi. They were then distressed and disturbed at the fact that their claim of descent from Guo Ziyi contradicted their being Hui, which required foreign ancestry. While the Encyclopædia Iranica claims the ancestor of the Guo clan in Baiqi was the Persian Ebn Tur (Daqqaq).

Notable people

Historical
 Guo Chongtao, General of the Chinese Five Dynasties and Ten Kingdoms period state Later Tang (and Later Tang's predecessor state Jin).
 Guo Chun, painter during the Early Ming Dynasty
 Guo Chuwang, patriot at the end of the Song Dynasty
 Guo Daiju, Official and Chancellor of the Tang Dynasty
 Guo Huai, Military General of Cao Wei
 Guo Jia, Official and Adviser under Warlord Cao Cao
 Guo Kan, a famed Chinese general that served under the Mongols
 Guo Nuwang, First Empress of Cao Wei
 Guo Pu, writer and scholar of the Eastern Jin
 Guo Rong, Second Emperor of Later Zhou also known as Chai Rong
 Guo Shengtong, First Empress of Emperor Guangwu
 Guo Shoujing, astronomer, engineer, and mathematician who lived during the Yuan Dynasty
 Guo Si, General who serve under Warlord Dong Zhuo during the Late Han Dynasty
 Guo Tu, adviser under Warlord Yuan Shao
 Guo Wei, Founding Emperor of Later Zhou
 Guo Xi, Chinese Painter of the Song Dynasty
 Guo Xiang Taoist of the Early Jin Dynasty
 Guo Xun, General of The Han Dynasty
 Guo Yuanzhen, General Official and Chancellor of the Tang Dynasty
 Guo Zhengyi, Official and Chancellor of the Tang Dynasty
 Guo Zhongshu, painter and scholar during the Song Dynasty
 Guo Ziyi, (697 – 781), general of Tang China who ended the Anshi Rebellion

Modern
 Terry Gou (郭台銘, born 1950), Taiwanese billionaire, founder and chairman of Foxconn
 Guo Ailun (born 1993), Chinese basketball player
 Guo Guangchang (born 1967), Chinese billionaire, founder and chairman of Fosun International
 Guo Jingjing (born 1981), Chinese Olympic diver
 Guo Jingming (born 1983), Chinese author and pop idol
 Guo Moruo (1892–1978), Chinese author, poet, historian, archaeologist and government official
 Guo Qi (born 1995), Chinese chess player
 Guo Songtao (1818–1891), Chinese diplomat and statesman during the Qing dynasty
 Guo Wengui (born 1967), Chinese billionaire businessman and political activist
 Guo Wenli (born 1989), Chinese curler
 Guo Xinwa (born 2000), Chinese badminton player
 Guo Ying (born 1991), Chinese singer and rapper, member of girl group Rocket Girls 101
 Guo Yonghuai (1909–1968), aerodynamics expert and a leader of China's atomic and hydrogen bomb projects
 Tina Guo (born 1985), Chinese-American cellist and erhuist
 Xiaolu Guo (born 1973), Chinese-British novelist and filmmaker
 Hean Tat Keh, Professor of Marketing at Monash University
 Teresa Kok (born 1964), Malaysian politician
 Kuo Fang-yu (born 1952), Minister of Labor of the Republic of China (2016–2017)
 Kuo Hsing-chun (born 1993), Taiwanese Olympic weightlifter
 Kuo Kuo-wen (born 1967), Deputy Minister of Labor of the Republic of China (2016–2017)
 Kuo Ping-Wen (1880–1969), Chinese educator
 Robert Kuok (born 1923), Malaysian born Chinese, Hong Kong billionaire, chairman of Shangri-La Hotels and Resorts
 Kwik Kian Gie (born 1935), Indonesian politicians
 Kwek Leng Beng (born 1940), Singaporean billionaire, executive chairman of Hong Leong Group Singapore
 Sherman Kwek (born 1975/76), Singaporean businessman, son of Kwek Leng Beng
 Kwok Wing-kin (born 1986), Hong Kong politician, leader of the Labour Party
 Aaron Kwok (born 1965), Hong Kong singer, dancer, and actor
 Kenix Kwok (born 1969), Hong Kong actress
 Sonija Kwok (born 1974), Hong Kong actress
 Roger Kwok (born 1964), Hong Kong actor
 Walter Kwok (born 1950), Hong Kong billionaire, former CEO of Sun Hung Kai Properties
 Burt Kwouk (1930–2016), British actor
 Phyllis Quek (born 1973), Malaysian based in Singapore actress
 Sam Quek (born 1988), British field hockey player and gold medal winner at the 2016 Rio Summer Olympics
 Quek Leng Chan (born 1941), Malaysian billionaire, co-founder of Hong Leong Group Malaysia
 Keh Chin Ann (郭振安; born 1974, disappeared in 1986), a twelve-year-old schoolboy who went missing in Singapore
 Quek Kee Siong 郭祺祥, a child rapist and murderer in Singapore

Fictional people
Guo Jing, protagonist in The Legend of the Condor Heroes

See also
Kwak (surname), the same surname in Korean.

References

Chinese-language surnames
Individual Chinese surnames